The 2010 season was the 96th season in Palmeiras's existence, and their 95th in Brazil's first division. Palmeiras also played the usual Campeonato Paulista, the Copa do Brasil and the Copa Sudamericana.

Palmeiras started the campaign under management of Muricy Ramalho, who was dismissed on 18 February 2010 after some bad results. Manager Antônio Carlos Zago took over Palmeiras at the same day.

On 18 May 2010, at exactly 3 months as the club's manager, Antônio Carlos Zago was dismissed after a discussion with Palmeiras's Direction office. After a small period without a permanent manager, Palmeiras squad was coached by interim Jorge Parraga.

On 13 June 2010, during the season's 1-month break for the World Cup in South Africa, Luiz Felipe Scolari agreed to manage the team, where he had previously worked between 1997 and 2000. The manager won important titles with the team, such as Copa do Brasil and Copa Mercosur in 1998, the Copa Libertadores in 1999 and the Torneio Rio – São Paulo in 2000.

Season

Friendlies

Palmeiras played a friendly match against Boca Juniors from Argentina, marking the club's last match in Palestra Itália. Palmeiras lost the match by 0–2.

Campeonato Paulista
Palmeiras started the campaign in the Campeonato Paulista 2010 under Manager Muricy Ramalho, who in the beginning of the tournament had some bad results with the team. Antônio Carlos Zago took over Palmeiras in February, and in his first match with the team, he defeated rival São Paulo by 2–0 in the Choque-Rei. Antônio Carlos managed Palmeiras with high-class wins against rivals, however Palmeiras didn't play well along the Championship and preferred to give more focus in the Copa do Brasil. After a bad campaign, on 7 April, Palmeiras finished the competition in 11th place with 25 points.

Pld = Matches played; W = Matches won; D = Matches drawn; L = Matches lost; GF = Goals for; GA = Goals against; GD = Goal difference; Pts = Points

Copa do Brasil
In the beginning of the year, Palmeiras appointed the Copa do Brasil as the club's primary objective of the season.
Palmeiras begun the campaign in the Copa do Brasil 2010 playing against Flamengo-PI, winning comfortably in the aggregated score. In the 2nd Round, Palmeiras faced Paysandu and won both matches easily, qualifying to play against Atlético Paranaense in the Round of 16. Palmeiras won the first match by 1–0 at Palestra Itália and in the second match, drew by 1-1, winning by 2–1 in the aggregated score. In the Quarter-Finals, Palmeiras faced champions from Goiás, Atlético Goianiense and won the first match in the final minutes, from Cleiton Xavier's 94-minute penalty. A week later, Palmeiras lost by 1–0 to Atletico Goianiense in Serra Dourada, sending the decision to penalties. Although the goalkeeper, Marcos, saved three penalty kicks, Palmeiras players missed four shots and was eliminated by Atletico Goianiense by 2–1 in the penalty kicks.
The elimination was a serious disappointment to Palmeiras, that tried hard to win the title and qualify to Copa Libertadores in 2011.

Campeonato Brasileiro
Palmeiras started the campaign in the 2010 Campeonato Brasileiro Série A playing against Vitória at home, achieving a 1–0 victory at the final minutes. In the 2nd Round, Palmeiras faced Vasco da Gama away and got a single point by a draw, in a very bad fixture by both clubs. After the draw, Palmeiras manager Antônio Carlos Zago and striker Robert, discussed with each other and both of them were dismissed by the club's direction.

The following week, the fixture was against Grêmio for the 3rd Round of the competition. Palmeiras won it easily by the score of 4–2 in a very active match by both sides. After the win Palmeiras secured the 4th position in the League table, the match will be remembered by Palmeiras as the last match played in the old home, Palestra Itália, as the stadium will be demolished for construction of the new Arena Palestra Itália. On 26 May, rival São Paulo was the next opponent for the 4th Round, the final score was of 0–1 to the Morumbi team in a very disputed game, with Palmeiras's striker, Ewerthon, losing a penalty at the 87th minute. The next match was against Grêmio Prudente at the club's former stadium, the Arena Barueri, but this time the ground was used to serve as a home match for Palmeiras, although the game wasn't bad, the final score was 0-0.

On 2 June, Palmeiras faced Flamengo playing at home again and the venue was the São Paulo municipal stadium, the Pacaembu, due to the construction of the Arena. The match was dominated by Palmeiras, but unfortunately the team failed to score again, hitting the opponents crossbar three times and conceding a goal two minutes before the end of the match, the goal was scored by Vágner Love, the club's former player. The following round saw Palmeiras face Internacional away from home and Palmeiras managed to score with Lincoln in the beginning of the first half, after that Inter equalized and the game finished 1–1.

This was the last match of the Série A before the FIFA World Cup, stopping the league in the seventh round and Palmeiras in the mid-table position. During the pause for the World Cup, Jorge Parraga, the team's interim manager was replaced by Luiz Felipe Scolari, who previously managed Palmeiras from 1997 to 2000, winning the Copa do Brasil and the Libertadores. Scolari agreed to manage the team even with proposal from other four Brazilian clubs.

The league continued on 15 July and Palmeiras faced State rivals, Santos FC, in the eighth round with some new players in the squad, such as the forwards Tadeu and Kléber, a club's former player and idol, and the midfielder Tinga who scored the winner in the second half. The match finished 2–1 for Palmeiras. Avaí was the next opponent, the match saw Palmeiras equalize with the home team at 2–2 in the beginning of the second half with Kléber, but Avaí scored two late goals to win a pretty two-sided match. In the league's 10th round, Palmeiras played against Botafogo and was winning the match until the middle of the second half by 2–0, when Marcos Assunção committed a tough foul and was dismissed, after the dismissal the club from Rio de Janeiro reacted and equalized in the final minutes. The following week, Palmeiras faced Ceará the league's 2nd placed, away from home, the match was good but the ball didn't cross the line in any of the both halves, the final result wasn't bad for Palmeiras, that stopped in the 10th place of the Série A.

After the end of the round, Palmeiras signed former Chilean idol, Jorge Valdivia, for 5 years from the Arabian side Al Ain. The signing of Valdivia left the club and especially the fans really glad. In the beginning of the 12th round, Palmeiras faced old rivals Corinthians, in the so-called Paulista Derby, and drew at home by 1–1. Although the bad result, Palmeiras attacked Corinthians almost every time in the match. Jorge Henrique scored for Corinthians at the 11th minute and Edinho equalized for Palmeiras at the 33rd minute, after that, Palmeiras scored three times, with Ewerthon twice and with Lincoln, but the referee pointed off-side in all of them.

For the League's 13th Round, Palmeiras drew with Goiás away from home by the score of 1–1. Ewerthon opened the score after just 12 minutes from the beginning with a long range shot. Palmeiras played extremely well during the first half, but in the second half, the team didn't make a good appearance, trying to hold a 1–0 lead until the end, when a dubious foul was committed by Palmeiras defence, and after the kick, Goiás drew with a header from Amaral. The result was disappointing for the team who was almost certain to win 3 points in the league. Despite of the bad result, the team continued 11th in the table awaiting the return of some important players to the squad. In the following round, Palmeiras won the match against Atlético-PR by 2–0 in a very good appearance from all the players.

On 22 August, the team faced Guarani in Campinas. The match was marked by the return of Palmeiras Chilean idol, Jorge Valdivia, who came as a substitute in the second half, in the end both teams played well and the score ended 0–0. In the 16th round of the Série A, Palmeiras lost by a surprising 3–0 against the league's last placed team at home. The match was a terrifying display from the home players who could not stop Atlético-GO. After the game, manager Scolari stated that Palmeiras still needed to fix the squad for the following matches. On 29 August, after some hard training determination from the players, Palmeiras took on Atlético Mineiro in Ipatinga instead of Belo Horizonte, because of the reconstruction of the Mineirão stadium for the 2014 FIFA World Cup, and begun losing by 1–0 after an early second half goal by Neto Berola chipping the ball past goalkeeper Marcos, but equalised with Marcos Assunção minutes later. At the end Kléber turned the score for the away team, who deserved the 3 points after a well played match with many goal chances being created. Palmeiras reached the 9th position of the league table after the triumph.

After the victory over Atlético Mineiro, the clube saw colombian left wingback, Pablo Armero, leave to join Udinese from Italy.

At midweek, Palmeiras faced Fluminense in Rio de Janeiro, the League's 1st placed team. After conceding a goal from Emerson in the 15th minute and playing a reasonable first half, Palmeiras was better in the second half and managed to equalise with Ewerthon at the 93rd minute. Palmeiras lost its next match, played against Cruzeiro in Pacaembu, where the team started winning by 2–0 after a great first half, but suffered 3 dramatic goals in the second period, the last of them was scored from an irregular position in the 85th minute. On 8 September, Palmeiras drew with Vitória in Salvador, with substitute Tadeu scoring for the away team in the second half. The match was the first of the second part of the Série A, the 20th Round.

The 21st Round saw Palmeiras face Vasco da Gama at home. The match was equal for both sides with Palmeiras making most of the shots in the game. At the end it was a goalless draw. The next match was played against Grêmio in Porto Alegre, Palmeiras dominated the rival for most of the match and scored with Marcos Assunção, from a free kick, and with a header by Ewerthon after a cross from the scorer himself. Grêmio scored with Jonas in the stoppage time after a corner kick, but Palmeiras secured 3 points. After the win Palmeiras was awaited by the Choque-Rei derby with São Paulo on the next Sunday. The 1st half of the match was bad for both teams, but in the second half São Paulo scored from two counterattacks, in the first one the new boy, Lucas, made a wonderful finish past Deola and the second was a great assist from the boy to Fernandão make 2–0. Palmeiras was unlucky in the 2nd half, where the team almost scored 4 times.

Pld = Matches played; W = Matches won; D = Matches drawn; L = Matches lost; GF = Goals for; GA = Goals against; GD = Goal difference; Pts = Points

Copa Sul-Americana
After the disappointing performance in the 2009 Série A, when Palmeiras almost won the league and after some bad results in the end of the championship, finished in 5th qualifying only to the Copa Sudamericana and not to the major South American tournament, the Copa Libertadores, the team started the competition playing against Brazilian rivals, Vitória in Salvador. Palmeiras played well but couldn't stop Vitória from scoring two goals, one of them a good free-kick by Ramon, the club's captain, and the other in the stoppage time. The final result was not good, because the team had to win by a 3-goal margin to qualify to the Round of 16, or face the penalties if a 2-goal win happened to come. The 2nd leg in São Paulo, saw a marvelous 3–0 win with very good performances from the whole squad, mainly from Tadeu, who scored twice and Marcos Assunção who commanded the team's victory with an outstanding match and a beautiful free-kick goal from 35 meters in the dying minutes, assuring a qualification to the next round with the aggregate score of 3–2.

Overall
{|class="wikitable"
|-
|Games played || 73 (19 Campeonato Paulista, 8 Copa do Brasil, 8 Copa Sudamericana, 38 Campeonato Brasileiro)
|-
|Games won || 29 (6 Campeonato Paulista, 6 Copa do Brasil, 5 Copa Sudamericana, 12 Campeonato Brasileiro)
|-
|Games drawn || 23 (7 Campeonato Paulista, 1 Copa do Brasil, 1 Copa Sudamericana, 14 Campeonato Brasileiro)
|-
|Games lost || 21 (6 Campeonato Paulista, 1 Copa do Brasil, 2 Copa Sudamericana, 12 Campeonato Brasileiro)
|-
|Goals scored || 96
|-
|Goals conceded || 82
|-
|Goal difference || +14
|-
|Best result || 5 – 1 (H) vs. Mogi Mirim – Campeonato Paulista – 16 January 2010
|-
|Worst result || 0 – 3 (H) vs. Atlético Goianiense – Série A – 26 August 2010
|-
|Most Appearances || Márcio Araújo (64 appearances)
|-
|Yellow cards || 128
|-
|Red cards || 10
|-
|Worst discipline || Pierre (16 , 2 )
|-
|Top scorer || Robert (14 goals)
|-

Updated 5 December 2010

Players

Squad information

(captain)

(vice-captain)

Sul-Americana squad

(vice-captain)

(captain)

Squad statistics

Note: Apps – Starting appearance (Substitute appearance)

Transfers

In

Out

Loaned in

Loaned out

Scorers

Clean sheets

Club
Coaching staff
{|class="wikitable"
!Position
!Staff
|-
|-
|rowspan="4"|Manager|| Muricy Ramalho  (until 18 February 2010) 
|-
| Antônio Carlos Zago  (until 18 May 2010) 
|-
| Jorge Parraga  (interim manager – until 13 June 2010) 
|-
| Luiz Felipe Scolari
|-
|rowspan="2"|Assistant managers|| Flávio Murtosa
|-
| Valdir Moraes
|-
|rowspan="2"|First team fitness coach|| Anselmo Sbragia
|-
| Darlan Schneider
|-
|rowspan="2"|Goalkeeping coach|| Fernando Miranda
|-
| Carlos Pracidelli
|-
|Head scout|| Marcos Aurélio Galeano
|-
|rowspan="3"|Club doctors|| Dr. Rubens Sampaio
|-
| Dr. Vinicius Martins
|-
| Dr. Otávio Vilhena
|-
|Reserve team manager|| Jorge Parraga
|-
|Physiologist|| Paulo Zogaib
|-
|rowspan="2"|Physiotherapists|| José Rosan
|-
| João Carlos Ferreira
|-
|Nutritionist|| Alessandra Favano

  (Portuguese) Other information

  (Portuguese)

References

2010
Brazilian football clubs 2010 season